Richard John McKenzie (15 March 1892 – 25 September 1968), known as Jock, was a rugby union footballer who played for the New Zealand national team, commonly called the All Blacks. He mostly played at second five-eighth, and made 20 appearances for New Zealand between 1913 and 1914. He played most of his provincial rugby for Wellingtong, but played two matches for Auckland in 1914 before the outbreak of the First World War. Most New Zealand rugby, including international matches, were suspended for the duration of the war. McKenzie was wounded during the war, and this forced him to retire from playing.

Citations

Sources 
 
 
 

1892 births
1968 deaths
New Zealand international rugby union players
New Zealand rugby union players
Wellington rugby union players
Auckland rugby union players
New Zealand military personnel of World War I
Rugby union players from Canterbury, New Zealand